MWC 480 is a single star, about 500 light-years away in the constellation of Auriga. It is located in the Taurus-Auriga Star-Forming Region. The name refers to the Mount Wilson Catalog of B and A stars with bright hydrogen lines in their spectra. With an apparent magnitude of 7.62, it is too faint to be seen with the naked eye.

Properties 

MWC 480 is a young Herbig Ae/Be star, a class of young stars with spectral types of A or B, but are quite young and are still not main-sequence stars. MWC 480 is about 7 million years old. It is about twice the mass of the Sun, and is estimated to be about 1.67 solar radii.

MWC 480 has X-ray emissions typical of a pre-main-sequence Herbig Ae/Be star but with an order of magnitude more photoelectric absorption. It has a gas-dust envelope and is surrounded by a protoplanetary disc that is about 11% the mass of the Sun. The disc is inclined about 37° towards the line of sight, on a position angle of about 148°. Astronomers using the ALMA (Atacama Large Millimeter/submillimeter Array) have found that the protoplanetary disc surrounding MWC 480 contains large amounts of methyl cyanide (CH3CN), a complex carbon-based molecule. Hydrogen cyanide (HCN) has also been detected in the disc. No signs of planet formation have yet been detected.

Planetary system
In 2021, an imaging of the gas flows in the circumstellar disk has suggested a presence of shrouded Jupiter-mass planet about 245 AU from the star.

References

External links
 

Articles containing video clips
Auriga (constellation)
Herbig Ae/Be stars
A-type main-sequence stars
023143
031648
BD+29 774
Hypothetical planetary systems
J04584626+2950370